Mark Thompson is an American newscaster and a two-time Emmy award winner for writing, hosting and producing specials for the Fox Broadcasting Company stations.

Television news
Thompson reported on science and environmental issues for KRON-TV, then an NBC affiliate in San Francisco, before getting upped to the nightly weather anchor on the 5, 6 and 11:00 p.m. editions of NewsCenter 4, in addition to those duties.

Mark Thompson pioneered Neighborhood Weather, where he would read letters from viewers who’d requested a live remote broadcast from their neighborhood in the Bay Area. 
This was known as “Neighborhood Weather”, a popular and enduring franchise. 
Thompson was the on-air nightly weather anchor, science, and even occasional lifestyle reporter for KTTV's Fox 11 News Los Angeles.  When he started appearing on KCOP-TV Channel 13 (the Fox-owned sister station of KTTV), Thompson became known for dancing during the weather reports on KCOP-TV's 11 PM newscasts, which he originally did on a whim. However, when email reaction was so enormously positive, he kept it going, quickly gaining not only a local following but nationwide attention as well.  He was featured on Jimmy Kimmel Live! on October 5, 2006, and on Brit Hume's program on Fox News Channel, among others.  He left both stations as of June 3, 2011.  He made no on-air announcements of his future plans as a weather anchor.  

Thompson previously served as an on-air weather anchor and science/environmental reporter at KMGH-TV in Denver, Colorado, and also worked at WKBW-TV in Buffalo, New York.

Radio news and talk
Thompson hosted a daily 10 AM-to-noon radio show on San Francisco talk station KGO until October 6, 2022; his show ended on that station due to a sudden change in format, and he, in fact, was the final host on the format, being notified immediately before his show of the change and being notified mid- monologue to end the broadcast at approximately 10:16 AM that day. He would promptly give a final station identification before abruptly ending his show.  The show concentrated on politics and pop culture and featured calls from listeners across the Bay Area and California. Thompson had originally done fill-in talk show hosting on KGO when he first worked in San Francisco as a news person. Thompson also regularly appears on The Tim Conway Jr. Show on KFI in Los Angeles. 

Thompson and CNN Latino anchor Elizabeth Espinosa hosted an early afternoon weekday talk program from early 2014 to late 2015.

Television hosting and announcing
Thompson is a regular hosting television shows of high drama and even life and death. He has hosted high-profile "event" shows like Celebrity Daredevils Live (FOX) with Dennis Rodman and Angie Everhart, all the Robbie Knievel jumps since 1990 (building to building in Las Vegas, over a portion of the Grand Canyon, and over an oncoming train).  He also hosted a live Knievel jump during which the weather prevented the jump and Thompson was asked to "fill" for the entire hour. The show still registered a 25 share.

Thompson has been a regular New Year's Eve host for FOX Television as well.  In these shows, he has presided over everything from building implosions to musical acts.

Thompson hosted the red carpet arrival show for the Emmy Awards on Fox Television (Sept. 2011). It was his second time hosting an Emmy red carpet show.

Thompson also hosted Hole in the Wall along with Brooke Burns for Fremantle Television. The show aired on Fox during 2008-2009.

For three successful seasons, Thompson hosted Guinness World Records Primetime on the Fox network, and those familiar with the genre will remember him as the host of When Good Pets Go Bad and the voice of many of the edgy Fox primetime reality shows at the time.

Thompson was the host of the weekly entertainment program That's So Hollywood, and was one of the primary fill-in hosts on Good Day L.A., Fox's highest rated Los Angeles morning show.

Career as a producer 
Thompson was formerly a creative partner in NEXT entertainment with Mike Fleiss.  Together they were responsible for a number of successful specials for Fox, and Thompson was the first person to pitch The Bachelor to ABC, though he credits Fleiss with the idea itself.

Other work
Thompson is a frequent panelist on political and cultural issues on The Young Turks network, and fills in for host, Cenk Uygur, on the show, The Conversation. His regular weekly podcast, The Edge with Mark Thompson, features conversations on politics, show business, and popular culture.

Thompson has been seen as a reporter, an anchorman, and even a moderator of presidential debates in feature films such as Set It Off, The Day After Tomorrow and The American President, and television shows such as 24 and Ghost Whisperer.

Thompson has been one of the leading voices in reality television, as his voiceovers were heard in the earliest days of reality TV and are still heard on shows such as  American Idol, Paradise Hotel, Are You Smarter Than a 5th Grader?, The Simple Life and Don't Forget the Lyrics. He was also the announcer on former Fox game shows Greed and It's Your Chance of a Lifetime. Thompson is the vocalist for the So You Think You Can Dance television show theme song for all versions of the show worldwide, and he is also the announcer for the US version of the show.

Radio Host:

The Mark Thompson radio show is heard Monday- Friday from 10a-noon PT on KGO810 radio in SF.  
While the station is in SF, the show enjoys input from listeners across the country and even in other countries.  The show is streamed across multiple platforms as well as being broadcast on radio.

Thompson has won multiple Golden Mic awards for his work in both radio and television.

Thompson sits in with Tim Conway Jr on KFIAM640 on Tuesday nights in Los Angeles and has been on KFI since 2013.

Personal
A native of Washington, D.C., Thompson graduated from Colgate University. He also studied at Oxford University in the United Kingdom.

A regular on the charity and fundraising circuit, Thompson is an active supporter of many philanthropic enterprises with a concentration in the areas of veganism and advocacy for animals, education, and environmental charities.

References

External links
 Official website 

Living people
Year of birth missing (living people)
American reporters and correspondents
American television journalists
Game show announcers
Television anchors from San Francisco
Television anchors from Los Angeles
Television anchors from Denver
American male journalists